Life Is Hot in Cracktown is a 2009 crime drama film based on Buddy Giovinazzo's 1993 collection of short stories with the same title. Giovinazzo directed and wrote the film.

Plot
The film intertwines several unsettling stories of people in a Manhattan neighborhood ravaged by crack cocaine.

Romeo, a 14-year-old criminal, is the leader of a gang. In the beginning of the movie, he lures his girlfriend, Debbie, to a secluded alley where he and another gang member gang rape her. He leads his gang into robbing and torturing a very sick pensioner, and then steps up to doing a murder-for-hire at the behest of a local drug dealer, unaware of the enormous risks.

Manny and Concetta, a young couple, are desperately trying to rise out of poverty and care for their sick baby. Manny works two jobs—the front desk of a drug-riddled flop house by day and the cash register of a frequently-robbed bodega at night.

Another young couple, Marybeth and Benny, are both drug addicts. Marybeth is a transgender woman who makes a bit of money as a street prostitute to pay for surgery, and Benny is into very low-paying burglaries.  Their principal source of drugs is a well-off trans person, Ridley, who is looking to follow in Marybeth's footsteps.

Young Willy and younger Susie are the much-neglected children of an addict named Mommy, who makes them sleep on the floor of their one-room apartment. Mommy's current boyfriend, a hot-tempered addict named Chaz, makes the children beg on the street for his drug money.  Willy's one bright spot is neighbor child Melody, whose mother pimps her out every night.  When Chaz and Mommy leave the children behind while they embark on a drug-fueled quest to get more drug money from a relative of Chaz, Melody is picked up by the police. Willy, meanwhile, is sent on a wild goose chase by Betty, an aging prostitute who enjoys tormenting her neighbors.

Cast
Evan Ross as Romeo
Stephanie Lugo as Debbie, Romeo's girlfriend
Shannyn Sossamon as Concetta a woman faced with the challenges of raising her sick child, wife of Manny 
Victor Rasuk as her husband Manny, who supports Concetta and his baby by working the front desk of a drug-infested tenement building by day and an often-robbed bodega at night
Lara Flynn Boyle as a faded and cruel prostitute named Betty McBain
Thomas Ian Nicholas  as Chad Wesley a rookie cop
Vondie Curtis-Hall as  street-toughened veteran cop
Kerry Washington as Marybeth/Mickey, a transsexual prostitute
Desmond Harrington as Benny, MaryBeth's "husband"
Mark Webber as Ridley/Gabrielle, a transgender prostitute and friend of MaryBeth
Brandon Routh as Sizemore, a homeless drug addict who sometimes talks to Willy 
RZA as a drug dealer named Sammy, who does business with Romeo
Carly Pope as Stacy
Tony Plana as an alcoholic man
Ridge Canipe as Willy, the older brother of Susie
Edoardo Ballerini as Chas, Mommy's abusive boyfriend
Illeana Douglas as Mommy, the heavily addicted mother of Willy and Susie
Elena Franklin as Melody Amber
Mayte Garcia as Murietta
Ariel Winter as Susie
Omar Regan as Cremont
Jeremy West as Mr. Rutherford, a crippled pensioner robbed by Romeo
Bryan Becker as Pepperton

Production
Director Buddy Giovinazzo revealed that originally the rape scene came twenty minutes into the film and the film opened in the bodega (convenience store).

References

External links
 
 

2009 crime drama films
American crime drama films
Films directed by Buddy Giovinazzo
Films about drugs
Films about prostitution in the United States
2009 films
2009 LGBT-related films
Films set in Manhattan
Films about trans women
2000s English-language films
2000s American films